The Tabula Banalis was the supreme court of Croatia. It was established in 1723 by Charles VI, ruler of the Habsburg monarchy. The court was presided over by the Ban of Croatia or by his deputy. For more important trials it was the first instance court, and served as the court of appeal for verdicts of the county courts (for counties (comitatus) of Croatia and Slavonia).

In 1850 it became the appellate court for all courts in Croatia and Slavonia, including the Land Court, later the Royal Court Table, Zagreb. 

From 1862 the supreme court of the Kingdom of Croatia-Slavonia 
was the Table of Seven (Latin: Tabula Septemviralis, Croatian: Stol sedmorice).

References

Sources 
 Dabinović, A. Hrvatska državna i pravna povijest : s reprodukcijama najvažnijih dokumenata i slikama. Zagreb : Matica hrvatska, 1940.
 Beuc, Ivan. Povijest institucija državne vlasti Kraljevine Hrvatske, Slavonije i Dalmacije: pravnopovijesne studije. Zagreb : Pravni fakultet, Centar za stručno usavršavanje i suradnju s udruženim radom, 1985.
 

18th century in the Habsburg monarchy
Defunct courts
Courts and tribunals established in 1723
Legal history of Croatia
Croatia under Habsburg rule
Kingdom of Croatia-Slavonia
Courts and tribunals disestablished in 1862